Jenesaispop, also known as JNSP, is an online Spanish independent news and reviews website focused on pop music, although it is also dedicated to films, TV series, books and comics. It was founded in 2006 by nine friends, including various journalists, who wanted to dignify pop music through recommendations of non-mainstream records. Is has been referred to as the most-read independent music website in Spain as of 2020, year in which they published their first book.

History
Jenesaispop was founded in 2006 by nine friends, including various journalists, who had their respective personal blogs and wanted to dignify pop music through an online fanzine with recommendations of songs that they considered were not receiving the exposure they deserved. They consider themselves "a pop music media above all" that endorses music "that anyone would like". It started doing well around 2010, when it had over 150,000 unique monthly visitors, and is the most-read independent music website in Spain as of 2020, according to Vogue magazine. In 2020, Jenesaispop celebrated its 15th anniversary by publishing its first book, Un Viaje Por 200 Discos Clave del Siglo XXI (Spanish for A Journey Through... 200 Key Records of the 21st Century), written by the website's director, Sebas E. Alonso.

The staff of Jenesaispop have interviewed numerous international celebrities, including Madonna, Clean Bandit, and Mon Laferte.

Album of the year
The following records have been named "album of the year" by Jenesaispop.

2021 – Zahara, Puta
2020 – Dua Lipa, Future Nostalgia
2019 – FKA Twigs, Magdalene
2018 – Rosalía, El Mal Querer
2017 – Lorde, Melodrama
2016 – Blackstar, David Bowie
2015 – Sufjan Stevens, Carrie & Lowell
2014 – Caribou, Our Love
2013 – James Blake, Overgrown
2012 – Beach House, Bloom
2011 – PJ Harvey, Let England Shake
2010 – Triángulo de Amor Bizarro, Año Santo
2009 – The xx, xx
2008 – Portishead, Third
2007 – Amy Winehouse, Back to Black
2006 – Belle & Sebastian, The Life Pursuit

Bibliography
2020: Alonso, Sebas. Un Viaje Por 200 Discos Clave del Siglo XXI. Self-published. ISBN 978-840-92-43.

References

Spanish music websites